Zachary Babington (born  – 15 October 1745) was an English barrister who served as High Sheriff of Staffordshire in 1713 and 1724.

He was the son of John Babington (High Sheriff in 1702), and was named for his grandfather Dr. Zachary Babington, chancellor of Lichfield Cathedral. He was distantly related to Anthony Babington, who in 1586 was hung, drawn and quartered on Tower Hill for his participation in the Babington Plot to put Mary, Queen of Scots, on the English throne. But a nearer relation had been chaplain to King Charles I.

Babington attended University College, Oxford, matriculating at age 17 in 1707, and was a student at the Inner Temple in 1708.

Babington resided at Curborough Hall, Curborough, Staffordshire, and later at Whittington Old Hall, Whittington, Staffordshire. Zachary Babington's daughter Mary married Theophilus Levett, town clerk of Lichfield, Staffordshire. The Levett family inherited the Babington estates at Curborough and Packington.

References

External links
 Babington of Curborough, Collections for a History of Staffordshire, William Salt Archaeological Society, 1885
 Zachary Babington, Whittington & District History Society
 Babington and Curborough Hall, British History Online
 Settlement of Will of Zachary Babington
 Curborough, Staffordshire, GENUKI
 Babington Family Tree, Whittington & District History Society, Whittington, Staffordshire

1690 births
1745 deaths
People from Lichfield
English barristers
High Sheriffs of Staffordshire
Zachary
Alumni of University College, Oxford